Triacetin, is the organic compound with the formula . It is classified as a triglyceride, i.e., the triester of glycerol. It is a colorless, viscous, and odorless liquid with a high boiling point and a low melting point. It has a mild, sweet taste in concentrations lower than 500 ppm, but may appear bitter at higher concentrations. It is one of the glycerine acetate compounds.

Uses
Triacetin is a common food additive, for instance as a solvent in flavourings, and for its humectant function, with E number E1518 and Australian approval code A1518.  It is used as an excipient in pharmaceutical products, where it is used as a humectant, a plasticizer, and as a solvent.

Potential uses
The plasticizing capabilities of triacetin have been utilized in the synthesis of a biodegradable phospholipid gel system for the dissemination of the cancer drug paclitaxel (PTX). In the study, triacetin was combined with PTX, ethanol, a phospholipid and a medium chain triglyceride to form a gel-drug complex. This complex was then injected directly into the cancer cells of glioma-bearing mice. The gel slowly degraded and facilitated sustained release of PTX into the targeted glioma cells.

Triacetin can also be used as a fuel additive as an antiknock agent which can reduce engine knocking in gasoline, and to improve cold and viscosity properties of biodiesel.

It has been considered as a possible source of food energy in artificial food regeneration systems on long space missions. It is believed to be safe to get over half of one's dietary energy from triacetin.

Synthesis 
Triacetin was first prepared in 1854 by the French chemist Marcellin Berthelot. Triacetin was prepared in the 19th century from glycerol and acetic acid.

Its synthesis from acetic anhydride and glycerol is simple and inexpensive.

 3  + 1  → 1  + 3 

This synthesis has been conducted with catalytic sodium hydroxide and microwave irradiation to give a 99% yield of triacetin. It has also been conducted with a cobalt(II) Salen complex catalyst supported by silicon dioxide and heated to 50 °C for 55 minutes to give a 99% yield of triacetin.

Safety
The US Food and Drug Administration has approved it as Generally Recognized as Safe (GRAS) food additive and included it in the database according to the opinion from the Select Committee On GRAS Substances (SCOGS). 
"Triacetin and two types of acetooleins have been found to be without toxic effects in long-term feeding tests in rats at levels that were several orders of magnitude greater than those to which consumers are exposed. Three types of acetostearins have been found to be without toxic effects in long-term feeding tests in rats at levels up to 5 g per kg per day. This contrasts with an estimated human consumption of a fraction of a milligram per kg per day. It is recognized that at an even higher feeding level (10 g per kg per day) male rats developed testicular atrophy and female rats, uterine discoloration. However, such a level which would amount to 50 g or more for an infant and 600 g for an adult per day, is vastly higher than would be possible in the consumption of foods to which acetostearins are added for functional purposes." 
Triacetin is included in the SCOGS database since 1975.

Triacetin was not toxic to animals in studies of exposure through repeated inhalation over a relatively short period.

References 

Acetate esters
Triglycerides
Plasticizers
Antiknock agents
Ester solvents
Excipients
E-number additives